The Chevron GR8 is a grand tourer race car, designed, developed and built by British manufacturer Chevron, for sports car racing, conforming to both FIA GT3 and FIA GT4 rules and regulation set by the FIA, and has been produced since 2010.

References

Chevron racing cars
Grand tourer racing cars
Sports racing cars
Cars introduced in 2010
2010s cars
Cars of England